Monish Nagaraj, known by his screen name Rishi, is an Indian actor, who works mainly in Kannada cinema. An engineering graduate, he was an active theatre artist before venturing into the Kannada film industry. He rose to fame with the 2017 blockbuster film Operation Alamelamma.

Early life and education
Rishi was born in Bangalore and brought up in Mysore, Karnataka. His father K. C. Nagaraj was a bank official working in Kaveri Grameena Bank and his mother Anala Nagaraj, is a home maker. His birth name is Monish Nagaraj. He did his schooling from St Joseph's Primary School, Mysore and Pre - University course from Marimallappa 's College, Mysore. He went on to attend Sri Jayachamarajendra College of Engineering, Mysore, pursuing a Bachelor’s in Civil Engineering.

During his engineering days, Rishi developed a keen interest in acting and started performing with various amateur theatre groups in Mysore. He was in charge of the dramatics team at his college and also worked as a Radio Jockey outside.

Career
Through campus placement upon graduation, Rishi got a job in a company and entered a brief corporate stint. Following this, he quit his job to become an entrepreneur in the retail interiors and merchandising field.

He then got an opportunity to appear in T. N. Seetharam's Mahaparva. Rishi continued to perform with established theatre groups in Bangalore until he got an opportunity to appear in a television daily, Anuroopa, which was telecast on Star Suvarna. His character portrayal in the serial won him Best Actor consecutively for two years at the Star Suvarna Parivar awards.

Debut and recognition 

In 2016, director Suni of Simple Agi Ondh Love Story fame cast Rishi for his thriller comedy film Operation Alamelamma. The film became one of the major blockbuster hits of 2017, also releasing in countries like USA and Europe. Rishi gained wide acclaim for his debut lead role of Purmy, a vegetable vendor. His next release was in 2019 named Kavaludaari which was directed by Hemanth Rao of Godhi Banna Sadharna Maykattu fame and produced by Puneeth Rajkumar under his production house  PRK Productions. The film became a blockbuster hit and Rishi gained huge appreciation for his role as Inspector K.S.Shyam from both critics and as well as by audience.

Rishi has finished shooting for Sakalakala Vallabha which is being directed and co produced by Jacob Verghese along with Tamil actor and producer Dhanush. He is also acting in Sarvajanikarige Suvarnavakaasha and Ramana avatara

Filmography

Television

Films

Awards

References

External links
 

Living people
Indian male film actors
Male actors in Kannada cinema
Male actors from Bangalore
1988 births